Clifton T. Eley (born June 21, 1961) is a former American football tight end who played one season. He played for the Minnesota Vikings in 1987 as a replacement player.

References

1961 births
Living people
Minnesota Vikings players
American football tight ends
Mississippi State Bulldogs football players
National Football League replacement players